Martyn Craig Campbell (born 1970 in Liverpool) is an English bass guitarist.

He is best known for his work with Rain, the Lightning Seeds, Richard Ashcroft, Wah! and Terry Hall. Campbell has also worked with Pete Wylie, and toured with Shack.

Associated acts
 Rain (1988–1992)
 The Lightning Seeds (1994–2000, 2009–present)
 Shack (2007–present)

Session discography
 Rain - A Taste of Rain (1991)
 The Lightning Seeds - Dizzy Heights (1996)
 Terry Hall - Laugh (1997)
 The Lightning Seeds - Tilt (1999)
 Mike Badger - Double Zero (2000)
 Arthur Lee & Shack - Live in Liverpool (2000)
 Steve Roberts - It Just Is (2001)
 Richard Ashcroft - Human Conditions (2002)
 John Power - Happening for Love (2003)
 Mike Badger - Lo Fi Acoustic Excursions (2004)
 Richard Ashcroft - Keys to the World (2006)
 Mike Badger - Rogue State (2011)

References

External links
 Martyn Campbell on Myspace
 
 

1970 births
Living people
English rock bass guitarists
Male bass guitarists
Musicians from Liverpool
The Lightning Seeds members
Shack (band) members
21st-century English bass guitarists
21st-century British male musicians